Zurab Ochihava (born 18 May 1995) is a Ukrainian professional footballer who plays as a defender for Sabah.

Career
He is a product of a different Kyiv's sportive schools.

He made his début for FC Illichivets Mariupol in the Ukrainian Premier League on 20 September 2014.

Dynamo Kyiv
In January 2019, he joined Dnipro-1 on loan.

Sabah
On 18 February 2021, Sabah announced the signing of Ochihava.

Personal life
His mother is a Ukrainian and his father is a Georgian.

References

External links

Ukrainian footballers
Ukrainian expatriate footballers
FC Mariupol players
Association football defenders
1995 births
Living people
Footballers from Kyiv
FC Dynamo Kyiv players
FC Dynamo-2 Kyiv players
Ukrainian people of Georgian descent
FC Olimpik Donetsk players
SC Dnipro-1 players
FC Vorskla Poltava players
FCI Levadia Tallinn players
Sabah FC (Azerbaijan) players
Ukrainian Premier League players
Meistriliiga players
Expatriate footballers in Estonia
Ukrainian expatriate sportspeople in Estonia
Expatriate footballers in Azerbaijan
Ukrainian expatriate sportspeople in Azerbaijan
Ukraine youth international footballers
Ukraine under-21 international footballers